Shannon & Company, also known as Shannon & Company Productions is an American film studio which develops, produces, and distributes films, website and television programming.

History
Founded in 1976 by director/actor R.J. Adams and wife producer Diane C. Adams as a full service Advertising Agency creating television, radio and print media for a number of clients throughout Los Angeles and Orange County. In the spring of 1980, the company converted to a broadcast and film production company focusing primarily on historical documentary projects and docudramas. In 1980 the company founded The Actors Workshop, Laguna Hills, Orange County, California.

Ad agency years
Security Pacific Bank, Ming of America, Adler shoes, Sombrero Street restaurant, Gustafson Lincoln/Mercury, System VII Insurance company and Backstage.

Film production company
The company has since rolled out a number of popular films including: “Ruins of the Reich”, “The Missions of California”, “Order Castles of the Third Reich” and “The Final Journey”. Recent and future productions include "Abeo Pharisee", "The Studio Club"′, "The Christmas Quilt", "Chasing Jose'" and its newest project now in pre-production "Fatal Crossroads.". Recently Executive Producer R.J. Adams directed the filming of Orchestra Musique Sur La Mer at the Royal College of Music in early June 2012 as part of the Queen's Diamond Jubilee London, England.

Shannon & Company Productions/Distribution

Notes and references

References

External links
 Official Website

Film production companies of the United States